Milton Williams (born November 22, 1945) is a retired American professional basketball point guard who spent three seasons in the National Basketball Association (NBA) and one season in the American Basketball Association (ABA). In the NBA, he played for the New York Knicks (1970–71), the Atlanta Hawks (1971–72) and the Seattle SuperSonics (1973–74). During his tenure in the ABA, Williams played for the Spirits of St. Louis during the 1974–75 season. Born in Seattle, Washington, he attended the Lincoln University of Missouri where he was drafted in the 17 round of the 1968 NBA Draft by the Knicks.

External links

1945 births
Living people
Allentown Jets players
American men's basketball players
Atlanta Hawks players
Basketball players from Seattle
Lincoln Blue Tigers men's basketball players
New York Knicks draft picks
New York Knicks players
Point guards
Seattle SuperSonics players
Spirits of St. Louis players
Wilkes-Barre Barons players